John Cahill (born 1957) is an Irish former hurler. At club level he played with Kilruane MacDonaghs and was also a member of the Tipperary senior hurling team.

Career

Cahill first played hurling at juvenile and underage levels with the Kilruane MacDonaghs. After captaining the club's under-21 team to divisional honours in 1978, he also won a Tipperary IHC title the same year. After winning three Tipperary SHC titles as a substitute, Cahill secured a permanent place on the senior team for his fourth success in 1985. He was at right corner-back on the Kilruane MacDonaghs team that won the All-Ireland Club Championship title in 1986.

At inter-county level, Cahill never played at minor or under-21 levels but was included on the Tipperary junior hurling team in 1983. He was called up to the senior team for the 1986 Munster SHC campaign.

Honours

Kilruane MacDonaghs
All-Ireland Senior Club Hurling Championship: 1986
Munster Senior Club Hurling Championship: 1985
Tipperary Senior Hurling Championship: 1977, 1978, 1979, 1985
North Tipperary Senior Hurling Championship: 1977, 1978, 1979, 1985, 1986, 1987, 1990
Tipperary Intermediate Hurling Championship: 1978

References

External link

 John Cahill player profile

1957 births
Living people
Kilruane MacDonaghs hurlers
Tipperary inter-county hurlers